Humphrey Gordon Barclay CVO MC (1882 - 2 October 1955) was a British Anglican priest.  He was Chaplain to King George VI and Queen Elizabeth II.

He was the eldest son of Col. H. A. Barclay CVO, sometime aide-de-camp to King Edward VII and King George V.  He was educated at Eton and Trinity Hall, Cambridge.  After further study at Lichfield Theological College, he was ordained in 1905.

During the First World War he served as a Padre, and on 1918 he was awarded the Military Cross.  Thereafter he was Rector of Carlton Forehoe, 1918–20; of Southrepps, 1920–25, and of Tittleshall, 1925–39.  He was appointed Domestic Chaplain at the St George's Chapel, Windsor Castle in 1940.  He was made a Commander of the Royal Victorian Order in 1946.

In 1906 he married, Beatrice Eremar, daughter of Benjamin Bond Cabbell of Cromer Hall.  They had two sons and three daughters. He lived at Southrepps Rectory.

References 

1882 births
1955 deaths
Alumni of Trinity Hall, Cambridge
Royal Army Chaplains' Department officers
Commanders of the Royal Victorian Order
Recipients of the Military Cross
People from Tittleshall
People educated at Eton College